Robert Thom (1774 Tarbolton, South Ayrshire, Scotland - 1847) was a Scottish civil engineer who worked upon major hydraulic projects on the Isle of Bute and Inverclyde.  On Bute, he created aqueducts to increase the flow of water which powered the cotton mills there, so that their capacity was increased.  This economic success resulted in him becoming the laird of Ascog.  He then created a larger system to supply water power to Greenock. The reservoir is named after him — Loch Thom — and the supply aqueduct is known as the Greenock Cut. In the early 1800s, he designed the first water purification plant in Scotland.

See also
 Slow sand filter

References

1774 births
1847 deaths
Scottish civil engineers
People from South Ayrshire